The 52d Combat Communications Squadron is located in Robins Air Force Base, Georgia. It is currently under the command of the 5th Combat Communications Group.

History
The 52d Combat Communications Squadron was constituted on 15 Jul 1988 and activated on 22 Jul 1988. It comprises a Missions Systems Flight (SCM), a Network Operations Flight (SCN), a Special Missions Flight (SCP), and a Support Flight (SCS). All of these work centers together accomplish the 52 CBCS primary mission, which is to rapidly deploy communications in support of the warfighters.

Decorations

Awards

Campaign streamers 
 Southwest Asia: Defense of Saudi Arabia
 Liberation and Defense of Kuwait

References

Communications squadrons of the United States Air Force